Stormbound or La Strada finisce sul fiume is a 1950 Italian crime melodrama film directed by Luigi Capuano.

Cast
Constance Dowling	as 	Barbara
Andrea Checchi		as 	Rol
Tino Buazzelli		as 	Sergeant
Bianca Doria		as 	Maria
Mirko Ellis		as 	Stefano
Paola Quattrini		as 	Nina
Aldo Silvani		as 	Marco
Amedeo Girardi

External links
 

1950 films
1950s Italian-language films
Films directed by Luigi Capuano
Films scored by Alessandro Cicognini
Italian crime drama films
1950 crime drama films
Italian black-and-white films
Melodrama films
1950s Italian films